Yo compro esa mujer (English title: I buy that woman) is a Mexican telenovela produced by Ernesto Alonso for Televisa in 1990. Based on the novel "The Count of Monte Cristo" by Alexandre Dumas, created by Olga Ruilópez and adapted by Liliana Abud.

Starring Leticia Calderón, Eduardo Yáñez, Enrique Rocha and Alma Muriel.

Plot
The Montes de Oca are a very rich family made up of two sisters, Matilde and Blanca Flor, and their cousin, Rodrigo. A love triangle occurs, since Matilde is in love with her cousin, but he prefers her sister. However, Blanca Flor loves a modest fisherman, Enrique San Román. When Rodrigo finds out, he falsely accuses Enrique of robbery to send him to jail; shortly after, he discovers that Blanca Flor is expecting a son from Enrique and decides to wait for the child to be born before making him disappear. In turn, Matilde, who hates her sister, tells her that her son died shortly after his birth. Shocked by the news, Blanca Flor goes crazy and Matilde locks her in a basement and makes everyone believe that she died.

Rodrigo gives the baby to the family maid, Soledad, so that she can deliver it to an orphanage, but she decides to save him and takes him to his father's friend's house, who adopts him and calls him Alejandro. After the alleged death of Blanca Flor, Rodrigo made a long trip to Europe, from which he returned married to a young aristocrat, Constanza Mendoza, already pregnant at the time. Blinded by her obsessive love, Matilde slowly poisoned Rodrigo's wife until she died shortly after giving birth to their daughter, Ana Cristina. Later, Alejandro's adoptive mother marries a very wealthy man who adopts the boy and gives him his last name, Aldama. Enrique is dying in prison, but before dying he asks to see his son and swears that he will take revenge on the Montes de Oca. Later the family goes to Europe, where Alejandro grows up knowing the history of his true parents very well.

As an adult, Alejandro is back in Mexico with the purpose of taking revenge on Rodrigo and his entire family. On the trip, Alejandro meets Ana Cristina without knowing that she is the daughter of Rodrigo, the man who destroyed his parents. When Alejandro discovers Ana Cristina's last name, he immediately understands who she is, but not only does he not stop loving her, but both swear that they will marry in Mexico. However, the situation is complicated for both of them.

Cast 
 
 Leticia Calderón as Ana Cristina Montes de Oca
 Eduardo Yáñez as Alejandro Aldama / Alejandro San Román Montes de Oca / Enrique San Román
 Enrique Rocha as Rodrigo Montes de Oca
 Alma Muriel as Matilde Montes de Oca
 Gerardo Acuña as Gabriel Álvarez
 Roberto Antúnez as Bernardo
 Socorro Avelar as Cayetana
 Carlos Cardán as Sagón
 Mario Casillas as Raúl de Marín
 Helio Castillos as Renato Grajales
 Isabela Corona as Soledad
 Connie de la Mora as Blanca Flor Montes de Oca
 Consuelo Duval as Susu
 Julieta Egurrola as Isabel de Marín
 Rosalinda España as Fifí
 Karime Favela as Gema
 Nerina Ferrer as Emilia
 Miguel Ángel Ferriz as Óscar de Malter
 Rosa Furman as Aunt Carmen
 Guillermo Gil as Pedro
 Ana Graham as Constanza
 Sara Guasch as Vda. de Berrón
 Luz María Jerez as Ursula / Emilia (young)
 Sergio Kleiner as Demarín
 Cynthia Klitbo as Efigenia "Efi"
 Mariana Levy as Jimena / Estrella / Ángela
 Melba Luna as Bernardina
 Miguel Manzano as Diego Álvarez
 María Marcela as Narda de Marín
 Ramón Menéndez as Vidal
 Marystel Molina as Celia
 Maricruz Nájera as Juliana
 Manuel Ojeda as Santiago
 Eduardo Palomo as Federico Torres Landa
 Gabriel Pingarrón as Servando
 Alejandra Procuna as Georgette
 María Regina as Mabel
 Bruno Rey as Fulgencio Castilla
 Dunia Saldívar as Maura
 Lorena San Martín as Cocó
 Yadira Santana as Brigitte
 Luis Xavier as Miguel de Marín
 José María Torre as Alejandro San Román Montes de Oca (child)
 Queta Lavat

Awards and nominations

References

External links 

1990 telenovelas
Mexican telenovelas
1990 Mexican television series debuts
1990 Mexican television series endings
Spanish-language telenovelas
Television shows set in Mexico
Televisa telenovelas